Santiago Gibernau (born 15 May 1988) is a Uruguayan rugby union player. He plays as a wing.

Gibernau plays for Carrasco Polo Club, in the Campeonato Uruguayo de Rugby.

He has 35 caps for Uruguay, with 10 tries scored, 50 points on aggregate. He had his first game at the 85–7 win over Paraguay, at 25 April 2009, in Montevideo, at the 2011 Rugby World Cup qualifyings. He scored a try in his international debut. He was named in Uruguay's squad for the 2015 Rugby World Cup. He played in three games but didn't scored.

Honours
Uruguay U20
World Rugby Under 20 Trophy: 2008

References

External links

1988 births
Living people
Uruguayan rugby union players
Uruguay international rugby union players
Rugby union players from Montevideo
Rugby union wings